Joseph Roman Selasini Shao (born 6 April 1961) is a Tanzanian CHADEMA politician and Member of Parliament for Rombo constituency since 2010.

References

1961 births
Living people
Chadema MPs
Tanzanian MPs 2010–2015
University of Dar es Salaam alumni